Coastal Connecticut, often called the Connecticut Shore or the Connecticut Shoreline, comprises all of Connecticut's southern border along Long Island Sound, from Greenwich in the west to Stonington in the east, as well as the tidal portions of the Housatonic River, Quinnipiac River, Connecticut River, and Thames River. It includes the southern sections of the state's Fairfield, New Haven, Middlesex and New London counties.

Coastal Connecticut has a modestly different local culture than inland Connecticut. Many of the residents of coastal Connecticut are much more tied to coastal activity (i.e. boating, beaches) and the region sees an influx of tourists in the May to October season, compared to inland Connecticut. Coastal Connecticut is the mildest area in Connecticut in winter and often has a frost-free season that is up to one month longer than inland areas. The region, as defined in the Connecticut General Statutes, consists of 36 Connecticut towns, including several of the largest in Connecticut.

Towns in the coastal area
This is a list of the towns and cities of Coastal Connecticut listed in geographical order from west to east.

Greenwich
Stamford
Darien
Norwalk
Westport
Fairfield
Bridgeport
Stratford
Shelton
Milford
Orange
West Haven
New Haven
Hamden
North Haven
East Haven
Branford
Guilford
Madison
Clinton
Westbrook
Deep River
Chester
Essex
Old Saybrook
Lyme
Old Lyme
East Lyme
Waterford
New London
Montville
Norwich
Preston
Ledyard
Groton
Stonington

References
General Statutes of Connecticut (2007), Title 22a, Chapter 444, Section 22a-94.

Regions of Connecticut
Long Island Sound